= Bagtygul Altybaýewa =

Soviet politician (1903–1972)

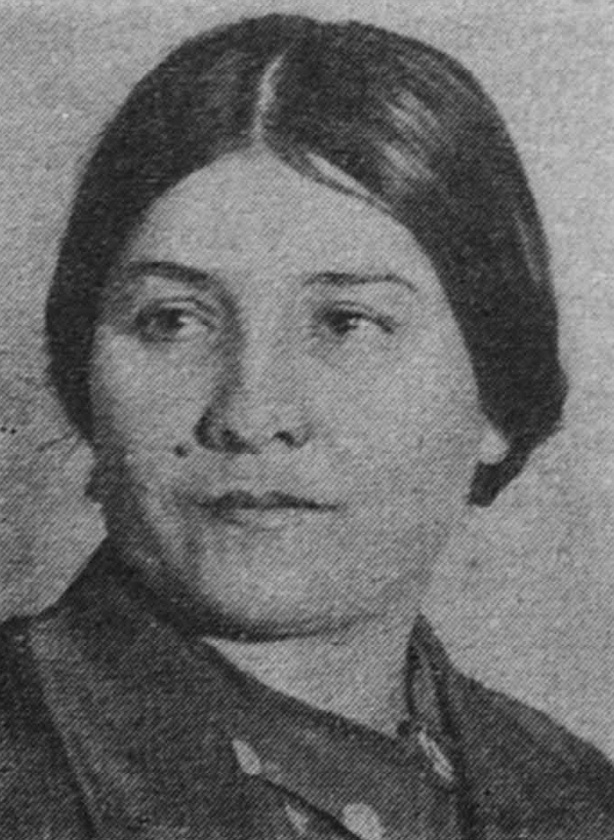
- Born: 1903; Gyzylsuv village, Krasnovodsk uyezd, Russian Empire (located in present-day Turkmenistan)
- Died: 5 January 1972; Ashgabat, Turkmen SSR, USSR
- Awards: Order of the Red Banner of Labor

Bagtygul Altybaýewa (1903 – 5 January 1972) was a Soviet politician. She served as a deputy in the Supreme Soviet of the USSR as well as various positions of power in the Turkmen SSR.

She was born in 1903 in Gyzylsuv village, located in what is now Turkmenistan. In 1927 she became a member of the Communist Party, when she began her political career. From 1927 to 1962 she worked as a weaver at the Cheleken cotton factory. In the Turkmen SSR, she worked as the deputy chairman of the Turkmen Cooperation Council, chairman of the Turkmen Republican Board of Trade Union, Minister of Light Industry of the Turkmen SSR, deputy head of the Exhibition of Economic Achievements of the Turkmen SSR. She was also a deputy in the Supreme Soviet of the USSR from the 1st to the 3rd convocations.
